Reinsfjellet is a mountain in Gjemnes Municipality in Møre og Romsdal county, Norway.

There is a road that goes all the way to the top, where there is a communications tower for radio and television.

References

Mountains of Møre og Romsdal
Gjemnes